Joseph Franklin Vosmik (April 4, 1910 – January 27, 1962) was an outfielder for the Cleveland Indians (1930–36), St. Louis Browns (1937), Boston Red Sox (1938–39), Brooklyn Dodgers (1940–41) and Washington Senators (1944). He helped the Dodgers win the 1941 National League Pennant.

He was voted in the 1935 American League All-Star Team as a right fielder. He finished 3rd in voting for the 1935 AL MVP Award for leading the league in hits (216), doubles (47) and triples (20). He also played in 152 games and had 620 at-bats, 93 runs, 10 home runs, 110 RBIs, 2 stolen bases, 59 walks, a .348 batting average, a .408 on-base percentage, a .537 slugging percentage, 333 total bases, and 5 sacrifice hits. He was traded from the Browns to the Red Sox for Bobo Newsom, Red Kress and Buster Mills on December 3, 1937. He finished 21st in voting for the 1938 AL MVP Award for leading the league in hits (201), playing in 146 games, and having 621 at-bats, 121 runs, 37 doubles, 6 triples, 9 home runs, 86 RBIs, 59 walks, a .324 batting average, a .384 on-base percentage, a .446 slugging percentage, 277 total bases, and 7 sacrifice hits.

In 13 seasons, he played in 1,414 games and had 5,472 at-bats, 818 runs, 1,682 hits, 335 doubles, 92 triples, 65 home runs, 874 RBIs, 23 stolen bases, 514 walks, a .307 batting average, a .369 on-base percentage, a .438 slugging percentage, 2,396 total bases, and 77 sacrifice hits. His career fielding percentage was .979.

From 1947 to 1951, he was a manager in the minor league system of the Indians.

He died in his hometown at the age of 51.

See also
 List of Major League Baseball annual doubles leaders
 List of Major League Baseball annual triples leaders

References

External links

 

1910 births
1962 deaths
American League All-Stars
Cleveland Indians players
St. Louis Browns players
Boston Red Sox players
Brooklyn Dodgers players
Washington Senators (1901–1960) players
Major League Baseball left fielders
Baseball players from Cleveland
Minor league baseball managers
Frederick Warriors players
Terre Haute Tots players
Louisville Colonels (minor league) players
Minneapolis Millers (baseball) players
Tucson Cowboys players
Oklahoma City Indians players